Justine Henin-Hardenne was the defending champion, but did not compete this year due to a cytomegalovirus.

Amélie Mauresmo won the title by walkover, as her opponent Venus Williams had to withdraw due to a left ankle strain. It was the 1st title of the year for Mauresmo and the 11th title of her career.

Seeds
The first eight seeds received a bye into the second round.

Draw

Finals

Top half

Section 1

Section 2

Bottom half

Section 3

Section 4

External links
 Main and Qualifying draws

Ladies German Open - Singles